Miyabe is a Japanese surname. Notable people with the surname include:

, Japanese volleyball player
Kingo Miyabe Japanese botanist
, Japanese Tendai monk
, Japanese writer
, Japanese samurai
, Japanese swimmer
, Japanese speed skater
, Japanese speed skater

Japanese-language surnames